The D&R Canal trail is a recreational trail in the U.S. state of New Jersey. The  trail is made up of three segments that transverse three counties: a canal towpath from New Brunswick to Trenton; a canal towpath/rail trail from Trenton to Bull's Island; and a rail trail from Bull's Island to Frenchtown. The three combined trails together form the largest completed trail in New Jersey. Much of the trail runs along the existing Delaware & Raritan Canal within the Delaware and Raritan Canal State Park.

There is no direct connection between the main and feeder canal paths along the Delaware River. Signed on-street connections are required to traverse the trail system in its entirety.

The proposed Capital to Coast Trail is planned to connect to the D&R Canal Trail. The trail is also part of the East Coast Greenway, a 3,000 mile long trail system connecting Maine to Florida.

Main canal towpath
The majority of the path was resurfaced in early 2011, however flooding by Hurricane Irene has scoured off the trail's top surface on the New Brunswick end leaving a coarse surface suitable for only pedestrians and mountain bikers. The main entrance in New Brunswick is at the Landing Lane Bridge.

Access Points
 New Brunswick/Landing Lane Bridge
 Route 287/Somerset
 Bound Brook
 Manville Causeway/Weston
 Amwell Road
 Griggstown Causeway, Princeton
 Alexander Street, Princeton

Feeder canal towpath/rail trail 
The feeder canal was used to supply water to the main canal from the Delaware River. The towpath/rail-trail's surface is sand and crushed stone. The trail begins in Trenton near Route 1 and ends north of Frenchtown.

Access Points
 Washington Crossing State Park
 Lambertville (on street parking)
 Jimison Farm
 Stockton
 Prallsville
 Bull's Island

Rail trail 
Technically, the D&R canal starts near Bull's Island (now a state campground) in Raven Rock where it connects to the Delaware River; the trail north of the Bull's Island inlet is a rail trail built on the former rail bed of the Pennsylvania Railroad Belvidere Division; the surface is crushed stone. Bordered by Route 29 on the east and the Delaware River on the west, there are few access points along its length.

The railroad line was originally built in the 1850s by the Belvidere Delaware Railroad which subsequently became a subsidiary of the United New Jersey Railroad and Canal Company. In the early 1870s, the railroad was leased by the Pennsylvania Railroad (PRR) and became an important freight branch. Competition from federally funded highways and automobiles caused passenger service to end by 1960. The government-created entity Conrail abandoned portions of the line between Trenton and Milford in the late 1970s. All trackage was removed by 1982. Much of the feeder canal path is actually a rail-trail; the only official towpath segments are in Trenton and Lambertville. The railroad is still present in Lambertville. 

Major Access Points (with parking)
 Bulls Island
 Frenchtown

External links 
 Official D&R Canal Park site
 Canal history site
 A cyclist's page for the feeder canal section
 guide Feeder path map
 Jimison Farm website

Rail trails in New Jersey
Bike paths in New Jersey
Protected areas of Hunterdon County, New Jersey
Protected areas of Mercer County, New Jersey
Protected areas of Middlesex County, New Jersey
Protected areas of Somerset County, New Jersey
National Recreation Trails in New Jersey
Delaware and Raritan Canal